"I Gave You My Heart (Didn't I)" is the third single taken from Hot Chocolate's 1983 album Love Shot. It was the only Top 20 single from the album, peaking at #13 in the UK Singles Chart in 1984. It remains a popular favourite among fans, but is not one of their more significant hits. The songwriter was Richard Gower, lead singer of the group Racey.

Track listing
7" vinyl
 "I Gave You My Heart (Didn't I)" (Richard Gower) – 3:33
 "Jeannie" (Errol Brown) – 3:49

References

1984 singles
Hot Chocolate (band) songs
1983 songs